Klein Family Field is a baseball stadium in Stockton, California. It is the home field of the University of the Pacific Tigers college baseball team. The stadium holds 2,500 people and opened in 2006. Prior to the completion of Klein Family Field, the Tigers played home games at Billy Hebert Field in Oak Park, Stockton, California.

Location history
Before the current baseball facility was built, the field's location was home to a football practice facility. Called Zuckerman Field, it was the practice field for the National Football League's San Francisco 49ers, who held training camp at the University of the Pacific from 1998 to 2002.

See also
 List of NCAA Division I baseball venues

References

External links
Venue information

Baseball venues in California
College baseball venues in the United States
Pacific Tigers baseball
Sports venues completed in 2006
2006 establishments in California